

De Mole River  is a locality in the  Australian state  of  South Australia located on the north coast of Kangaroo Island overlooking Investigator Strait about  south-west of the state capital of Adelaide. 
 
The locality’s boundaries were created in May 2002 for the “long established name” which is reported to be derived from the stream located within its boundaries.

The principal land use within the locality is conservation and some agriculture, with uncleared land and land adjoining the coastline having additional statutory constraints to 'conserve natural flora and fauna' and “conserve the natural features of the coast.”

De Mole River is located within the federal division of Mayo, the state electoral district of Mawson and the local government area of the Kangaroo Island Council.

References
Notes

Citations

Towns on Kangaroo Island